Langaha madagascariensis (formerly Langaha nasuta, commonly known as the Madagascar or Malagasy leaf-nosed snake) is a medium-sized highly cryptic arboreal species. It is endemic to Madagascar and found in deciduous dry forests and rain forests, often in vegetation 1.5 to 2 meters above the ground.

Description 
Malagasy leaf-nosed snakes can grow up to 1 meter in length. There is considerable sexual dimorphism within the species; the males are dorsally brown and ventrally yellow with a long tapering snout, while the females are mottled grey with a flattened, leaf shaped snout. The function of their appendage is unknown, but obviously also serves as camouflage.

It is largely a sit-and-wait predator. It may show curious resting behaviour, hanging straight down from a branch. Prey items include arboreal and terrestrial lizards.
It also exhibits hooding while stalking prey. These hooding and swaying behaviours along with its cryptic colour patterns, might allow L. madagascariensis to mimic a vine swaying in the wind. 

Leaf-nosed snakes are oviparous with clutch sizes ranging from 5 to 11 eggs.
Malagasy leaf-nosed snakes are generally calm and reluctant to bite unless provoked. Envenomation by the snake causes severe pain in humans, but is not deadly.

References 

Pseudoxyrhophiidae
Snakes of Africa
Reptiles of Madagascar
Endemic fauna of Madagascar
Venomous snakes
Reptiles described in 1790
Taxa named by Pierre Joseph Bonnaterre